Bowditch may refer to:

Books
Bowditch's American Practical Navigator, an encyclopedia of navigation

People
Ben Bowditch (born 1984), English footballer
Brian Bowditch (born 1961), British mathematician
Charles Pickering Bowditch (1842 – 1921), grandson of Nathaniel Bowditch, brother of Henry Pickering Bowditch, American archaeologist and specialist in Mayan linguistics
Clare Bowditch (born 1975), Australian musician
Dean Bowditch (born 1986), English footballer
Henry Ingersoll Bowditch (1808–1892), American abolitionist, physician, public reformer
Henry Pickering Bowditch (1840–1911), American physiologist, Dean of Harvard Medical School
Ian Bowditch (born 1939), Australian fencer
Nathaniel Bowditch (1773–1838), American mathematician and author of Bowditch's American Practical Navigator
Steven Bowditch  (born 1983), Australian professional golfer

Ships
USCS Bowditch, a United States Coast Survey schooner in service from 1854 to 1874
USNS Bowditch, the name of more than one United States Navy Military Sealift Command ship
USS Bowditch (AG-30), later AGS-4, a United States Navy survey ship in commission from 1940 to 1947

Others
Bowditch (crater), a lunar crater
Bowditch Field, sports venue in Massachusetts, United States
Bowditch School, historic school in Boston, Massachusetts, United States